Don Pedro (de) Moctezuma Tlacahuepan Ihualicahuaca was a son of the Aztec emperor Moctezuma II and María Miyahuaxochtzin, the daughter of Ixtlilcuecahuacatzin, ruler of Tollan.

The Counts and later Dukes of Moctezuma de Tultengo are descended from Moctezuma II through Pedro Tlacahuepan and his son Diego Luis Moctezuma (Ihuitl Temoc), who went to Spain. 

Diego Luis' son, Pedro's grandson, Pedro Tesifón de Moctezuma y de la Cueva was created "Count of Moctezuma" by Philip IV of Spain in 1628.

Pedro
15th-century indigenous people of the Americas
15th-century births
Year of birth unknown
Year of death unknown

Aztec nobility